Seticosta tinga is a species of moth of the family Tortricidae. It is found in Peru.

The wingspan is 25 mm. The ground colour of the forewings is yellowish, preserved in the form of two interfasciae with brownish maculation (spots) along their median parts. The remaining area is chestnut brown with brown marks. The hindwings are creamish with dense grey strigulation (fine streaks).

Etymology
The species name refers to Tiango, the type locality.

References

Moths described in 2010
Seticosta